| name = Union of the Argentine People
| native_name = Unión del Pueblo Argentino
| abbreviation = UdelPA
| logo = File:UDELPA LOGO.png
| logo_size = 200px
| leader1_title = Leader
| leader1_name = Pedro Eugenio Aramburu (1962-1970)
| founder = Pedro Eugenio Aramburu
| foundation = 1st: 2 January 19622nd: 24 August 1972
| dissolution = 1st: 28 June 1966 (prohibited)2nd: 1987
| successor = Popular Federalist Alliance
| headquarters = Buenos Aires, Argentina
| ideology = Conservatism, MilitarismAntiperonism
| position = Right
| colors = Blue
| country = Argentina
}}
The Union of the Argentine People was an Argentine Right-wing political party founded in 1962 by Pedro Eugenio Aramburu, aiming to establish an antiperonist centrist alternative. Led by him and in a coalition with the Democratic Progressive Party, it could reach the third place in 1963 Presidential election, getting 17,81% of the votes. The party was dissolved by the 1966 Coup, which declared the abolition of all political parties. Though the party had a rebirth in 1972, the assassination of Aramburu and the lack of a strong leadership forced them to merge in a coalition with the Popular Federalist Alliance, led by ex-Navy Captain Francisco Manrique.

Political parties established in 1962
Conservative parties in Argentina
1962 establishments in Argentina